The Florida First District Court of Appeal, also known as the First DCA, is headquartered in Tallahassee, Florida, the state capital. It is unique among the six Florida District Courts of Appeal in that, much like the U.S. Court of Appeals for the D.C. Circuit at the federal level, it handles most of the appeals in state administrative law matters. It is also solely responsible for handling appeals in workers' compensation cases. It is the Court of Appeals for 32 Florida counties, covering the Panhandle as well as the northeast and north-central parts of the state.

Controversy over new courthouse

Before December 2010, the First DCA had been located two blocks from the Supreme Court of Florida in downtown Tallahassee.  During December, the First DCA moved into a new courthouse on the southeastern outskirts of the city.  The $48.8 million construction cost of the new courthouse generated considerable controversy, particularly given that the new building contained details and amenities such as "miles" of African mahogany, granite top desks, and a sixty-inch flat screen television in each judge's chamber. The opulence of the new building led many critics to dub the new courthouse as the "Taj Mahal," and eventually led to the forced resignation of Paul M. Hawkes as the court's chief judge.

Investigation into the building's construction revealed that after receiving an initial $1.8 million appropriation in the 2006 state budget, then-Governor Jeb Bush threatened to veto the appropriation unless the judges considered remodeling and expanding their existing facility.  After receiving letters containing such assurances, the governor left the money in the budget. In 2007, judges on the court had the Florida Legislature appropriate an additional $7.9 million toward construction of a new courthouse. In the final days of that year's legislative session, judges had lawmakers slip an amendment into a transportation bill authorizing a $33.5 million bond issue for the new building.

Composition

See also

 Florida Second District Court of Appeal
 Florida Third District Court of Appeal
 Florida Fourth District Court of Appeal
 Florida Fifth District Court of Appeal

References

External links
Florida First District Court of Appeal Website
Website of the Florida District Courts of Appeal

Florida appellate courts
Courts and tribunals with year of establishment missing